Dave O'Donnell is an American record producer, engineer and mixer, known for his work with James Taylor, Sheryl Crow, Bettye LaVette, Eric Clapton, Keith Richards, John Mayer, Lyle Lovett, Milton Nascimento, Keb' Mo' and Ray Charles.

In 1984, O'Donnell began work at Power Station studios in Manhattan, beginning as a runner and working his way up to engineer. During this period he worked with artists including Eric Clapton, Ian Hunter, Mick Ronson and Chic. He went on to work as a freelance record producer, engineer and mixer. In 2000, O'Donnell began a long-standing relationship with James Taylor and has since worked with him on five studio albums over the last 20 years.

Awards
Grammy nominations
 2015 - Best Engineered Album - James Taylor - Before This World - producer, engineer and mixer.
 2007 - Best Engineered Album - Deborah Cox - Destination Moon - engineer
 2006 - Album of The Year - John Mayer - Continuum - engineer
 2003 - Best Engineered Album - Aaron Neville - Nature Boy - The Standards Album - engineer

Grammy wins
 2020 - Best Traditional Pop Vocal Album - James Taylor - American Standard - producer, engineer, mixer
 2010 - Best Jazz Vocal Album - Kurt Elling - Dedicated To You - mixer

TEC Award wins
 2015 - "Record Production Album" - James Taylor - Before This World - producer, engineer and mixer
 2008 - "TV Sound Production" - One Man Band - producer, engineer, mixer
 2008 - "Surround Sound Production" - One Man Band - producer, engineer, mixer
 2006 - "Record Production Album" - John Mayer - Continuum - engineer
 2006 - "Record Production Single" - John Mayer - Waiting On The World To Change - engineer

Emmy nominations
 2014 - "Outstanding Sound Mixing for a Variety Series or Special" - The Kennedy Center Honors' Music Tributes - mixer
 2009 - "Outstanding Achievement in Live and Direct to Tape Sound Mixing" - We Are One - The Obama Inaugural Celebration - engineer, mixer

Selected works

2020 - Sheryl Crow - Woman in the White House - mixing engineer, recording
2020 -	Sheryl Crow - In the End - mixing engineer, recording
2020 - Josh Groban Harmony	- Engineer, Mixing
2020 -	Bettye LaVette - Blackbirds - engineer, mixing, recording
2020 - James Taylor - American Standard - producer, engineer, mixer
2019 - Sheryl Crow - Threads - engineer, mixer
2019 - Clark Beckham "I Need" - mixer
2018 - Bettye LaVette - Things Have Changed - engineer, mixer
2016 - Keith Urban - "Gone Tomorrow" - engineer
2015 - Keith Richards - Crosseyed Heart - engineer, mixer
2015 - James Taylor- Before This World - producer, engineer, mixer
2015 - Boz Scaggs - "Rich Woman" - mixer
2014 - Smokey Robinson - "Ain't That Peculiar" - producer, engineer, mixer
2014 - Henry Butler & Steve Bernstein - Vipers Drag - engineer, mixer
2013 - Katy Perry - "Birthday" - engineer
2013 - Heart - "Stairway To Heaven" - mixer
2013 - Ray Charles - "None of Us Are Free" - mixer
2012 - K'naan ft. Keith Richards - K'naan ft. Keith Richards - "Sleep When I Die" - engineer 
2012 - Fiorella Mannoia - Sud - mixer
2011 - Kelly Clarkson - "Why Don't You Try" - engineer
2009 - James Taylor - Other Covers - producer, engineer, mixer
2009 - Kurt Elling - Dedicated To You - mixer
2009 - Benny Reid - Escaping Shadows - engineer
2008 - James Taylor  - Covers - engineer
2007 - Eric Clapton & Keith Richards - "Key to The Highway" - mixer
2007 - Kurt Elling - Nightmoves - engineer
2007 - Patti Scialfa - Play It As It Lays - engineer
2007 - James Taylor - One Man Band - producer, engineer, mixer
2006 - John Mayer - Continuum - engineer
2006 - Skye Edwards - "What's Wrong With Me?" - producer, remix
2005 - John Mayer - The Village Sessions - mixer
2005 - Burt Bacharach - At This Time - engineer
2004 - Circo - En el Cielo de Tu Boca  - mixer
2004 - Volume Cero - Estelar - mixer
2003 - Aaron Neville - Nature Boy - engineer
2003 - Kronos Quartet with Astor Piazzola - Five Tango Sensations - mixer
2003 - Lyle Lovett - "G.T.O." - engineer, mixer
2002 - Jimmy Buffett - Far Side of The World - engineer, mixer
2002 - Deep Purple - "Hush" - mixer
2000 - James Taylor - October Road - engineer, mixer
2000 - Lyle Lovett - "What I'd Say?" - engineer, mixer
2000 - Keb' Mo' - The Door - engineer, mixer
1999 - Lyle Lovett - "Summer Wind" - engineer, mixer
1998 - Milton Nascimento - Tambores De Minas - mixer
1997 - Milton Nascimento - Nascimento - engineer, mixer
1992 - Chic - Chic-ism - engineer, mixer
1989 - Tina Turner - Foreign Affair - engineer
1989 - Eric Clapton - Journeyman - engineer
1989 - Ian Hunter & Mick Ronson - Yui Orta

References

Awards and discography references
 Dave O'Donnell Awards
 Dave O'Donnell Discography

External links
 

Year of birth missing (living people)
Living people
American record producers
Mixing engineers